Pomacea glauca is a species of freshwater snail, an aquatic gastropod mollusk in the family Ampullariidae, the apple snails.

The species varies greatly in color, shape and size, growing to around 70 mm. Its colors include a pale yellow with brown spiral bands to darker shades of brown or purple with darker bands.

Distribution 
The species is found in the Dominican Republic, the Lesser Antilles and northern South America including Venezuela, Colombia, Brazil and on the West Indian island of Dominica.

Ecology 
This snail generally inhabits clean and clear water, where it can reach high population densities. The eggs are bright green and around the size of a small pea.

References

External links 

glauca
Gastropods described in 1758
Taxa named by Carl Linnaeus
Fauna of the Dominican Republic